Fancy Dress is a 1919 British silent comedy film directed by Kenelm Foss and starring Godfrey Tearle, Ivy Duke and Guy Newall. A lawyer hires a strolling player to impersonate an aristocrat.

Cast
 Godfrey Tearle as Tony Broke  
 Ivy Duke as Hebe  
 Guy Newall as Earl of Richborne 
 Will Corrie as The Guv  
 Elaine Madison as Eighth Wonder 
 Frank Miller as Dick Scribe  
 George Tawde as Mike  
 Kitty Barlow as Ma  
 Patricia Stannard as Mrs. Van Graft  
 Bryan Powley as Mr. Rong 
 James English as Mr. Wright

References

Bibliography
 Low, Rachael. History of the British Film, 1918-1929. George Allen & Unwin, 1971.

External links

1919 films
1919 comedy films
British silent feature films
British comedy films
Films directed by Kenelm Foss
Films set in England
British black-and-white films
1910s English-language films
1910s British films
Silent comedy films